Talaat Harb Pacha (25 November 1867 – 13 August 1941) was a leading Egyptian entrepreneur and founder of Banque Misr, and its group of companies, in May 1920.

His works
The establishment of Banque Misr, the first real Egyptian bank owned by Egyptian shareholders and staffed by Egyptian nationals, where Arabic (the national language) was used in all communications, was a major step in establishing a national economic identity.

The idea of establishing Banque Misr first emerged in 1907, when Talaat Harb contributed 100 EGP to the establishment of Al Ahly SC. He was a renowned nationalist industrialist, he published a book calling for the founding of a national bank with Egyptian financing. He called attention to the idle funds invested by foreigners for purposes other than the interests of Egypt. He continued advocating this call on all occasions, with untiring persistence. Harb co-founded a newspaper, Al Jarida, which was the official organ of the Umma Party. In 1911, he published another book titled "The Egyptian Economic Reform and the Nation's Bank Project ", where he explained his economic idea.

In recognition of the importance of spreading banking awareness within and outside Egypt, the bank sought to spread its branches all over the country and in several states: Lebanon, Syria, Sudan, Yemen and Saudi Arabia.

The bank, under the leadership of Talaat Harb, established a number of companies operating in various sectors, such as: textiles, shipping, publishing, movie making, insurance and the first national airline: Egypt Air.

He had many roles in many modern Egyptian economic crisis and incidents like Kom Ombo sugar crisis and the likes of cotton trading.

After the declaration of the Republic in Egypt, Talaat Harb was honored by naming several streets and squares in Cairo and other cities after him. His statue adorns Talaat Harb square in downtown Cairo. In 1980, on the occasion of the sixtieth anniversary of Banque Misr, the late President Anwar Sadat, awarded Talaat Harb posthumously the Nile Collar, which is the highest-ranking of all Egyptian decorations. It is granted exclusively to kings, heads of state and those who rendered great services on a national or human level in general.

He also initiated many economic projects in Saudi Arabia for which he was acknowledged by presenting two pieces of the Kiswa of Kabaa by HM King Abdul-‘Aziz Al-Sa‘ud of Saudi Arabia in 1936. In 2002 the two Kiswa pieces were donated by his grandchildren to a museum.

Personal life
Talaat Harb lost his wife at a relatively early age.  He was survived by his four daughters: Fatma, Aisha, Khadiga and Hoda (Before her death she donated a piece of land and money to build an academic cardiac institute at Ain Shams Faculty of medicine).

He was commemorated in the writings and poems of the then poet laureate Ahmed Shawqi, Abbās al-Aqqād, Ihsan Abdel Quddous, Salah Gawdat and the Lebanese-American Kahlil Gibran.

Projects established by Talaat Harb
Some of them are presented in this list:
 1920: Banque Misr; capital LE80,000
 1922: Misr Printing House; capital LE5,000
 1923: The Egyptian Company for Paper Manufacture; capital LE30,000
 1923: Misr Company for Cotton Ginning; capital LE30,000
 1925: Misr Company for Acting and Cinema (Studio Misr); capital LE15,000
 1926: The Egyptian Real Estate Co.; capital LE116,000
 1926: Egypt-France Bank; capital 5 million F. Francs
 1927: Misr Weaving Co.; capital LE300,000
 1927: Misr Fishery Co.; capital LE20,000
 1927: Misr Silk Weaving Co.; capital LE10,000
 1927: Misr Linen Co.; capital LE45,000
 1929: Egypt-Syria Bank; capital one million Syrian Lira
 1930: Misr Transport and Shipping Co.; capital LE160,000
 1932: Egyptian Products Sale Co.; capital LE5,000
 1932: Misr Air Co.; capital LE40,000
 1934: Egypt Travel Co., capital LE7,000
 1934: The Egyptian Company for Leather and Tanning
 1935: Misr for Mines and Quarries Co.; capital LE40,000
 1937: Misr for the Manufacture and Trade of Oil; capital LE30,000
 1938: Misr al-Beida for Dyeing, in co-operation with Bradford, capital LE250,000
 1940: Egypt Medical Pharmaceuticals, capital LE10,000
 1907: Al-Ahly (The National) Sporting Club (by giving credit to the club foundation committee.

See also
Banque Misr

References

1867 births
1941 deaths
20th-century Egyptian economists
Egyptian pashas
Egyptian nationalists
Egyptian industrialists
20th-century Egyptian businesspeople
Egyptian newspaper founders